Hypatia is a genus of moths in the subfamily Arctiinae. The genus was described by William Forsell Kirby in 1892.

Species
 Hypatia delecta Butler, 1896
 Hypatia melaleuca Walker, 1854

References

External links

Arctiinae